Crashing Thru may refer to:
 Crashing Thru (1949 film), an American western film
 Crashing Thru (1939 film), an American northern action film
 Crashin' Thru, a 1923 American silent Western film

See also
 Crashing Through (disambiguation)